The Waterways of Tongxi Creek are a group of small lakes and streams located in the left (western) bank of Xiang River, Yuelu District, Changsha, Hunan, China. The Tongxi Creek is the main stream and it is a seasonal river, its headwaters rise in the Shifeng Mountain of Pingtang Subdistrict.

References

Rivers of Changsha
Tributaries of the Xiang River